The 2019–20 Euro Hockey League was the 13th season of the Euro Hockey League, Europe's premier club field hockey tournament, organized by the European Hockey Federation. The Knockout 16 was held in  Barcelona in October 2019 and the Final 8 was originally scheduled to be held in Amstelveen in April 2020.

Waterloo Ducks were the defending champions but they failed to qualify for this year's edition.

Due to the COVID-19 pandemic in Europe the Final 8 was put on hold. On 12 May 2020, it was announced that the Final 8 was postponed to October 2020. The Final 8 was officially cancelled on 14 August 2020.

Association team allocation

A total of 20 teams from 11 of the 45 EHF member associations participated in the 2019–20 Euro Hockey League. The association ranking based on the EHL country coefficients is used to determine the number of participating teams for each association:
 Associations 1–3 each have three teams qualify.
 Associations 4–6 each have two teams qualify.
 Associations 7–11 each have one team qualify.

Association ranking
For the 2019–20 Euro Hockey League, the associations are allocated places according to their 2019 EHL country coefficients, which takes into account their performance in the Euro Hockey League and the EuroHockey Club Trophy from 2016–17 to 2018–19.

Teams
League positions of the previous season shown in parentheses (RS: Regular season winners).

Format changes
For the 2019–20 season the EHL moved to a new format with the removal of the round-robin tournament in round one. Instead, a knock-out format will be used from the start of the tournament. Round one was replaced by the knockout 16 with four sides advancing to the quarter-finals, or Final 8 as it's called, on Easter.  The Final 8 will consist of the champions from the top four nations on the EHL rankings table alongside the four sides that qualified from the knockout 16.  This means that instead of a total of 24 teams from 12 associations there were 20 teams from 11 associations.

Knockout 16
The Knockout 16 was held at the Pau Negre Stadium in Barcelona, Spain from 4 to 6 October 2019. The draw took place on 18 July 2019. The four winners from the knockout 8 advance to the Final 8 in April 2020.

Bracket

Knockout 16

Ranking matches

Knockout 8

Final 8
The Final 8 was originally scheduled to be held at the Wagener Stadium in Amstelveen, Netherlands from 9 to 13 April 2020. The draw took place on 18 October 2019. On 12 May 2020, it was announced that the Final 8 was postponed to be held from 14 to 18 October 2020. The Final 8 was officially cancelled on 14 August 2020.

Statistics

Top goalscorers

See also
 2020 Euro Hockey League Women
 2020 Men's EuroHockey Club Trophy I
 2020 Men's EuroHockey Indoor Club Cup

References

External links
 

Euro Hockey League
2019–20 in European field hockey
October 2019 sports events in Europe
Sports events curtailed due to the COVID-19 pandemic